Vernonanthura is a genus of Neotropical plants in the Vernonieae tribe within the daisy family.

The genus name of Vernonanthura is in honour of William Vernon (1666/67 - ca.1711), who was an English plant collector, (bryologist) and entomologist from Cambridge University, who collected in Maryland, USA in 1698. As well as the complex ending derived from 'anthera' (anther) and 'oura' (tail), referring to the frequently tailed anther base of the plant.

Species
The species include:

 formerly included
see Critoniopsis Vernonia 
 Vernonanthura cichoriiflora (Chodat) H.Rob. - Vernonia cichoriiflora Chodat
 Vernonanthura hintoniorum (B.L.Turner) H.Rob. - Vernonia hintoniorum B.L.Turner
 Vernonanthura liatroides (DC.) H.Rob. -  Vernonia liatroides DC.
 Vernonanthura oaxacana (Sch.Bip. ex Klatt) H.Rob. - Vernonia oaxacana Sch.Bip. ex Klatt
 Vernonanthura patens (Kunth) H.Rob. - Vernonia patens Kunth
 Vernonanthura serratuloides (Kunth) H.Rob. - Vernonia serratuloides Kunth
 Vernonanthura stellata (Spreng.) H.Rob. - Critoniopsis stellata (Spreng.) H.Rob.

References

 
Asteraceae genera